Anže Košnik (born 10 July 1991) is a Slovenian footballer who plays for SC Pinkafeld.

References

External links
PrvaLiga profile 

1991 births
Living people
Slovenian footballers
Slovenian expatriate footballers
Association football forwards
NK Triglav Kranj players
NK Krka players
Sportspeople from Kranj
Slovenian expatriate sportspeople in Austria
Expatriate footballers in Austria